The London, Midland and Scottish Railway (LMS) Princess Royal Class is a class of express passenger 4-6-2 steam locomotive designed by William Stanier.  Twelve examples were built at Crewe Works, between 1933 and 1935, for use on the West Coast Main Line.  Two are preserved.

Overview 

The Princesses are related to the GWR 6000 Class (also known as the King Class), the general outline essentially being a King with a larger firebox supported by additional trailing wheels. This origin is explained by the designer William Stanier coming from the GWR to the LMS.

When originally built, they were used to haul the famous Royal Scot train between London Euston and Glasgow Central.

Construction 
A prototype batch of three locomotives was to be constructed in 1933. Two were constructed as drawn but the third set of frames was retained as the basis for an experimental turbine locomotive.

Turbomotive 

The third prototype was constructed with the aid of the Swedish Ljungstrom turbine company and known as the Turbomotive, although not named. It was numbered 6202, in sequence with the Princess Royals. Although 'generally similar' to the rest of the Princess Royals, and 'not all that much different', it used a larger 40 element superheater to give a higher steam temperature, more suitable for turbine use. This boiler was also domeless as would later be used for the second batch of the Princess Royals. The continuous exhaust of the turbine, rather than the sharper intermittent blast of the piston engine, also required changes to the draughting and the use of a double chimney. It entered service in June 1935 on the London–Liverpool service.

This Turbomotive was rebuilt in 1952 with conventional 'Coronation' cylinders and named Princess Anne, but was soon destroyed in the Harrow and Wealdstone rail crash.

Later production 
A second batch of eleven locomotives was constructed later.

Accidents and incidents
 On 17 April 1948, a passenger train hauled by locomotive No. 6207 Princess Arthur of Connaught was halted after a passenger pulled the communication cord. It was then hit from behind by a postal train, which a signalman's error had allowed into the section, resulting in the deaths of 24 passengers.
 On 21 September 1951, locomotive No. 46207 Princess Arthur of Connaught was hauling an express passenger train that was derailed at Weedon, Northamptonshire due to a defective front bogie on the locomotive. Fifteen people were killed and 35 were injured.
 On 8 October 1952, locomotive No. 46202 Princess Anne was one of the locomotives on the 8:00 a.m express from Euston to Liverpool and Manchester, along with LMS Jubilee Class No. 45637 Windward Islands. Princess Anne took serious damage in the crash, having the leading bogie torn off and main frames buckled, and was scrapped after being deemed uneconomic to repair it.

Naming 
Each locomotive was named after a princess, the official name for the class was chosen because Mary, Princess Royal was the Colonel-in-Chief of the Royal Scots. However, the locomotives were known to railwaymen as "Lizzies", after the second example of the class, named for Princess Elizabeth, who later became Queen Elizabeth II. Later examples of 4-6-2 express passenger locomotive built by the LMS were of the related but larger, Coronation Class.

Withdrawal 
The class was withdrawn in the early 1960s in line with British Railways' modernisation plan.

Details

Preservation
Two examples, 6201 Princess Elizabeth and 6203 Princess Margaret Rose are preserved and both have operated on the mainline in preservation.  They were named after the two children of Prince Albert, Duke of York (later King George VI), and his wife, Elizabeth, Duchess of York (later Queen Elizabeth, and after the king's death, Queen Elizabeth the Queen Mother).  Princess Elizabeth Alexandra Mary (later Queen Elizabeth II) was seven years old in 1933 when her namesake was built, and Princess Margaret Rose was nearly five in July 1935 when her namesake was completed.  At the time, they were third and fourth in line to the throne. 'Princess Margaret Rose' is owned by The Princess Royal Class Locomotive Trust and is on static display at the West Shed Museum, Midland Railway-Butterley, Ripley, Derbyshire.

Note: Loco numbers in bold mean their current number.

Gallery

Media 
 6201 at Langho on Whalley Bank – sound recording.

References 

 Ian Sixsmith The Book of the Princess Royal Pacifics 
 Hugh Longworth British Railway Steam Locomotives 1948–1968 
 
 David Hunt, Bob Essery and Fred James LMS Locomotive Profiles No. 4: The "Princess Royal" Pacifics

External links

 6201 Princess Elizabeth Locomotive Society LTD
 Princess Royal Locomotive Trust
 46201 in the Railuk database
 46203 in the Railuk database
 Butlins steam locomotives
 6207 A Study In Steel at YouTube

 
8 Princess Royal
4-6-2 locomotives
Railway locomotives introduced in 1933
Standard gauge steam locomotives of Great Britain
Passenger locomotives